The Federal Correctional Institution, Fort Dix (FCI Fort Dix) is a low-security United States federal prison for male offenders in New Jersey. It is operated by the Federal Bureau of Prisons. A satellite prison camp houses minimum-security male inmates.

FCI Fort Dix is located in Burlington County adjacent to Joint Base McGuire-Dix-Lakehurst. Fort Dix is the largest single federal prison in the United States in the number of inmates housed there. 

It is divided up into three compounds: The separate East and West Compounds (both low-level, each constituting a single prison in its own right) and a camp between the two.

Notable incidents

Identity theft ring
In early 2010, a joint FBI and Federal Bureau of Prisons investigation found that Dimorio McDowell (50711-019), an inmate at FCI Fort Dix, was operating a major identity theft ring from the prison. Eight co-conspirators, with whom McDowell communicated by telephone, were also arrested. The ring targeted credit cards issued by major chain stores such as Macy's, Saks Fifth Avenue, Staples, Home Depot, Lowes and others. McDowell and his co-conspirators obtained the personal information of credit card holders through customer service departments and added themselves as authorized users. When McDowell's co-conspirators went to make purchases, they showed false identification or provided the last four digits of the cardholder's Social Security number and charged high-end items such as a John Deere tractor, big-screen televisions, snow blowers and stoves. The companies that issued the cards, including Citigroup Financial, HSBC and GE Capital, lost between $500,000 to $1 million.

McDowell subsequently pleaded guilty to aggravated identity theft and conspiracy to commit wire fraud and bank fraud and was sentenced to 14 additional years in prison on January 18, 2011. McDowell is currently incarcerated at the United States Penitentiary in Atlanta, which has a Communication Management Unit, where inmate contact with the outside world is severely restricted and tightly monitored. He is scheduled for release in 2028.

Notable inmates (current and former)

High-profile inmates

Politicians

Fraudsters

Others

See also

List of U.S. federal prisons
Incarceration in the United States

References 

Buildings and structures in Burlington County, New Jersey
Fort Dix
Prisons in New Jersey